Walter Haynes (December 14, 1928 – January 1, 2009) was an American steel guitarist and music producer who worked with such artists as Patsy Cline Jimmy Dickens, Del Reeves, The Everly Brothers and Jeanne Pruett. He also co-wrote a number of songs including "Girl on the Billboard" - a song that became a No. 1 hit for Del Reeves in 1965. Haynes was a member of the Steel Guitar Hall of Fame. At the time of his death at the age of 80 in Tyler, Texas, he had been teaching music lessons in Bullard, Texas.

References

1928 births
2009 deaths
American country guitarists
American male guitarists
Steel guitarists
American male songwriters
20th-century American guitarists
20th-century American male musicians